"À tout casser" is a song by French singer and actor Johnny Hallyday. It was used in the opening title sequence of the 1968 film of the same name. Hallyday also released it as a single and on his 1968 studio album Jeune homme. The B-side "Cheval d'acier" also appears in the film, where Hallyday performs it on stage.

Composition and writing 
The song was written by Johnny Hallyday, Georges Aber, and Tommy Brown. The recording was produced by Micky Jones, Tommy Brown, and Lee Hallyday.

Commercial performance 
In France the single spent two weeks at no. 1 on the singles sales chart.

Track listing 
7" single Philips B 370.639 F (1968, France etc.)
 A. "À tout casser" (2:48)
 B. "Cheval d'acier" (2:29)

Charts

References

External links 
 Johnny Hallyday – "À tout casser" (single) at Discogs

1968 songs
1968 singles
French songs
Johnny Hallyday songs
Philips Records singles
Number-one singles in France
Songs written by Johnny Hallyday
Songs written by Tommy Brown (singer)
Songs written by Georges Aber
Song recordings produced by Lee Hallyday
Song recordings produced by Mick Jones (Foreigner)